Tahchin is an Iranian rice dish primarily consisting of rice, yogurt, saffron, eggs and finally barberries (zereshk) are sprinkled on top. Some versions of the dish are more elaborate, folding in chicken fillets, vegetables, fish, or red meat. Tahchin can also be made with other ingredients such as walnuts and pomegranate. The texture of the crust depends on the type of rice that is used.

Tahchin is composed of two different parts: the thin tahdig part which includes the chicken fillets, saffron, and other ingredients at the bottom of the cooking pot, and the second part which is white rice. In restaurants, tahchin is mostly prepared and served without white rice.

Types of Tahchin 
Tahchin can be cooked in various ways such as:

 Chicken Tahchin
 Meat Tahchin
 Meat and eggplant Tahchin
 Spinach Tahchina
 Bani Tahchin

Jaj Baraneh Tahchin is cooked in the same way in all cases. The bottom of the crease can be cooked both in the oven and on a gas flame. When pulling the bottom of the crease, it is better to put a little melted butter on the bottom.

References

External links
 How to cook Persian Tah-Chin

Resources
 Translated from Persian Wikipedia - ته چین

Iranian cuisine
Kurdish cuisine
Rice cakes